Gohil may refer to:

 Gohil dynasty, 12th-century rulers of Saurashtra in modern Gujarat
 Gohil, a Gujarati'rajsthani clan
 Gahlot, a clan of rajputs
 Dinita Gohil, British actress
 Gigabhai Gohil (died 2020), Indian politician
 Manav Gohil (born 1974), Indian television actor
 Manvendra Singh Gohil (born 1965), Indian prince
 Mokhadaji Gohil (1309–1347), ruler of Ghogha, near Bhavnagar in Gujarat
 Parthiv Gohil (born 1976), playback singer for Indian films